Kosovo, officially the Republic of Kosovo, is a partially-recognized state in Europe.

Kosovo may also refer to:

Places

Entities on the same territory
Autonomous Province of Kosovo and Metohija, an autonomous province that Serbia claims to still have under its sovereignty
Autonomous Region of Kosovo and Metohija (1945-1963), an autonomous region in the People's Republic of Serbia
Autonomous Province of Kosovo and Metohija (1963-1968), an autonomous province in the Socialist Republic of Serbia
Socialist Autonomous Province of Kosovo (1968-1990), an autonomous province in the Socialist Republic of Serbia
Kosovo District, an administrative district of Serbia in central Kosovo
Kosovo-Pomoravlje District, an administrative district of Serbia in eastern Kosovo
Kosovo Vilayet, a former prefecture of the Ottoman Empire (1877–1912)
Republic of Kosova (1991–1999), an unrecognized secessionist state before the Kosovo War
Kosovo Polje, a municipality in Kosovo District

Bulgaria
Kosovo, Kyustendil Province
Kosovo, Plovdiv Province
Kosovo, Shumen Province
Kosovo, Vidin Province
, Veliko Tarnovo Province
, Ruse Province

North Macedonia
 Kosovo, Makedonski Brod, a village near Makedonski Brod
 Kosovo Dabje, a village near Delčevo

Russia

Other uses
"Kosovo" (song), a song criticizing US involvement in the Kosovo War
Kosovo Pomoravlje, a valley
Kosovo War
Malo Kosovo
North Kosovo

See also
Kosova (disambiguation)
Kosovo Polje (disambiguation)
Kosowo (disambiguation)
Kosava (disambiguation)
Kosów (disambiguation)
Metohija (disambiguation)
Names of Kosovo